Firmat is a city located in the south of Santa Fe Province, Argentina in the Departamento General López.  The main economic resources are agro-industry and agriculture. The city covers an area of about 226 km² (90 mi²). The population of Firmat stood at 19,757 per the 2010 national census. The annual temperature of the city usually ranges between 10 and 23 degrees Celsius (50 and 73 °F).

History

Early years
Firmat was founded in 1888, when a railway station by that name was completed at the location along the Santa Fe Western Railway. The line owed its existence to a Spanish Argentine investor, Carlos Casado del Alisal, and the latter is regarded as the town's founder. The commune itself was formally established on November 20, 1894. The Firmat Football Club was founded 13 years later, in 1907, and the Club Atlético Argentino de Firmat, in 1922. The town became an important center of Argentine agriculture, and some of the town's main employers include Vassalli Fabril, a firm specializing in farm equipment founded in Firmat in 1949, and Nestlé. Firmat was recognized as a municipality by the Provincial Legislature in 1962, and the city's local news daily is Diario Firmat.

"Haunted" swing 

In June 2007, a swing in a children's playground was reported to the police after locals had discovered that it would move backwards and forwards non-stop on its own for ten days before stopping dead, while other swings would remain still. Parents and children were convinced that a ghost was to blame.  According to a teacher: "One child called it the Blair Witch Playground. We believe it is haunted." Parents decided that the playground must indeed be haunted.

On April 13, 2011 episode of the Syfy Channel show, Fact or Faked: Paranormal Files, the crew went to Firmat to investigate the haunted swing. They were able to recreate the movement of the swing with a monofilament, but determined that it was not a viable hoax. Ultimately, after covering the swing with an inflatable dome and performing simulated wind tests, they determined that wind was the likely culprit coupled with the fact that the haunted swing was slightly larger than the other swings and had more surface area to catch the wind.

According to a 2017 article by Ranker, the swing "has been swinging by itself for five years - even when people try to stop it from moving". It is claimed the swing is used by the ghost of a small child, who died nearby before the playground was built.

References

External links 
El Correo newspaper
Firmat newspaper
Firmat Football Club Website

Populated places in Santa Fe Province
Populated places established in 1894
Reportedly haunted locations in Argentina